"Real Love" is a song by the German recording artist Sarah Connor. A piano-led pop ballad, it was written by Alexander Geringas, Bernd Klimpel, Rike Boomgaarden, and Charlie Mason and produced by the former for her seventh studio album, Real Love (2010). It was her last single in English until the release of "Ring Out The Bells" twelve years later, as she has been performing in her native language German in the time between. Released as the album's second single on 7 December 2010 in German-speaking Europe, the song reached number 54 on the German Singles Chart, making it Connor's only English-language single to miss the German Top 50.

Track listings

Credits and personnel
Production – Alexander Geringas
Mixing – Alexander Geringas, Marc Schettler 
Recording – Kay D., Rob Tyger

Charts

Weekly charts

References

2010 singles
Sarah Connor (singer) songs
2010 songs
Songs written by Alexander Geringas
Universal Music Group singles
Songs with lyrics by Charlie Mason (lyricist)